The discography of California rapper Vince Staples consists of five studio albums, four mixtapes, two extended plays and 25 singles (including ten singles as a featured artist).

Albums

Studio albums

Mixtapes

EPs

Singles

As lead artist

As featured artist

Other charted songs

Guest appearances

Notes

References 

Discographies of American artists
Hip hop discographies